{{DISPLAYTITLE:C20H34O2}} 
The molecular formula C20H34O2 may (molar mass : 306.48 g/mol) refer to: 

 Dihomo-gamma-linolenic acid
 Incensole
 Mead acid
 Sciadonic acid

Molecular formulas